This list, 2016 in molluscan paleontology, is a list of new taxa of ammonites and other fossil cephalopods, as well as fossil gastropods, bivalves and other molluscs that have been described during the year 2016.

Ammonites

Research
 A study on the phylogenetic relationships of the Middle Jurassic ammonites from India is published by Dutta & Bardhan (2016), who name a new perisphinctid subfamily Sivajiceratinae.
 Ammonite embryonic shell clusters preserved within the body chambers of mature macroconch shells of the Early Cretaceous (Aptian) ammonite Sinzovia sazonovae are described by Mironenko & Rogov (2016), who interpret the finding as indicative of ovoviviparity in at least some ammonites.

New taxa

Other cephalopods

Research
 Exceptionally preserved specimens of Acanthoteuthis speciosa, providing new information on the anatomy of members of the species, are described from the Upper Jurassic of Solnhofen (Germany) by Klug et al. (2016).
 A description of the external characters and internal structures of a well-preserved specimen of Proteroctopus ribeti from the Middle Jurassic (Callovian) Lagerstätte of La-Voulte-sur-Rhône (France) and a study on the phylogenetic relationships of the species is published by Kruta et al. (2016).

New taxa

Gastropods

Research
 An unnamed species of Heliconoides is described by Janssen & Goedert (2016) based on a single specimen from the Late Cretaceous (Campanian) of the San Juan Islands (Washington, United States).

New taxa

Other molluscs

Research
 Fossil pearls attached to the shells of members of the genus Anodonta are described from the Pleistocene Nihewan Formation (China) by Li et al. (2016).

New taxa

References

2016 in paleontology
2016 in science